The Morongo Basin is an endorheic basin and valley region located in eastern San Bernardino County, in Southern California.

The Morongo basin is part of the Inland Empire region,  and is considered to be the easternmost portion of the Greater Los Angeles Area, the 2nd largest metropolitan region in the United States.

Geography 

The drainage basin stretches approximately from the Little San Bernardino Mountains north of Interstate 10 in the south, to the Interstate 40 area in the north. Lying within the Mojave Desert, the Morongo Basin is east of the city of San Bernardino and San Bernardino Mountains, and north of the Coachella Valley and Colorado Desert.

The Morongo Basin is located within the Mojave Desert and in the High Desert region of Southern California. The higher sections of Joshua Tree National Park are within the basin.

The terrain in the area is a desert landscape of hills and alluvial fans framed by mountain ranges.

Natural history
The Mojave yucca (Yucca schidigera) (namesake of Yucca Valley) and the Joshua tree (Yucca brevifolia) (namesake of Joshua Tree city and park) are notable native plants in the region.

The basin's habitats are home to Black-tailed jackrabbits, coyotes, and the Mojave Rattlesnake (Crotalus scutulatus).

Cities and Communities

Over 15,000 
Yucca Valley
Twentynine Palms

Under 15,000 
Landers 
Pioneertown 
Joshua Tree 
Marine Corps Air Ground Combat Center Twentynine Palms
Wonder Valley

Climate 

The climate is arid desert. Hot, dry summers; cool winters with cold mornings and occasional snow and rain showers. Snow falls in areas above  in elevation.

Local attractions 
Joshua Tree National Park supports most of the tourism to the Morongo Basin and Morongo Valley.
Sand to Snow National Monument surrounds the Morongo Valley on all sides.
Pioneertown Mountains Preserve
The Pacific Crest Trail passing through it and the San Gorgonio Wilderness area of the San Bernardino National Forest, between the peak and Morongo Basin.
Mount San Gorgonio rising above the basin on the west, the highest point in Southern California.
Integratron

Education 
The Morongo Basin is home to the Morongo Unified School District, which serves all of the cities and communities in the area. Copper Mountain College is the only community college serving the Morongo Basin area, located in Joshua Tree.

The nearest four year public university is California State University, San Bernardino north of the city of San Bernardino in University Heights, California.

See also
Morongo Basin Transit Authority
Morongo desert snail
Mount San Gorgonio

Mojave and Colorado Deserts Biosphere Reserve

References 

Geography of San Bernardino County, California
Inland Empire
Mojave Desert
Regions of California
Endorheic basins of the United States
Valleys of the Mojave Desert
Valleys of San Bernardino County, California
Sand to Snow National Monument
Twentynine Palms, California
Yucca Valley, California